Como se Tornar o Pior Aluno da Escola (How to become the worst student in school) is a 2017 Brazilian comedy film based on the eponymous book by comedian Danilo Gentili. The film was directed by Fabrício Bittar and the screenplay was written by Gentili with collaborations from various other writers.

The film received mostly negative reviews following its release, but the performance of the young cast was praised.

Synopsis 
Bernadinho (Bruno Munhoz) and Pedro (Daniel Pimentel) are high school students and face the burden of doing well at school and behaving, while the principal Ademar (Carlos Villagrán) enacts increasingly complex and specific rules. Frustrated, Pedro comes upon a hand-made book with advice on how to cause chaos in school without being caught.

Cast 
Danilo Gentili as Worst Student
Bruno Munhoz as Bernardo
Daniel Pimentel as Pedro
Carlos Villagrán as Principal Ademar
Joana Fomm as Math teacher
Moacyr Franco as Janitor
Fábio Porchat as Cristiano
Raul Gazolla as Physical education teacher
Rogério Skylab as History teacher
Marcelo Rafael as Security officer

Controversy 
While promoting the film, Gentili used his social networks to incite attacks on the authors of negative reviews. An example was the CinePOP website, which accused the director of initiating a wave of virtual attacks.

In another case, a producer criticized Folha de S.Paulo journalist Diego Bargas, of Folha de S. Paulo, for conducting an allegedly interview with him. On Facebook, Gentili published the interview paired with images of Bargas' posts praising former Presidents of Brazil Luiz Inácio Lula da Silva and Dilma Rousseff and former mayor of São Paulo Fernando Haddad. As a result, Bargas was attacked on social media and fired by Folha for his political comments. Folha justified its decision by stating that Diego had "disrespected repeated guidance on behavior in social networks." According to the newspaper, "journalists are told to avoid expressing political-party positions and not to issue social media comments that compromise the independence of their reports".

Gentili's behavior and his followers', as well as the newspaper's decision to fire the reporter, were widely panned by class entities. In a joint statement, the Union of Professional Journalists of the State of São Paulo and the National Federation of Journalists "vehemently repudiate[d] the attacks on the journalist and his dismissal," which they considered acts which jeopardized the principles of freedom of the press and of expression.

References

External links
 

Brazilian comedy films
2017 comedy films
2017 films
2010s Portuguese-language films
Film controversies in Brazil